Rory Carroll (born 1972) is an Irish journalist working for The Guardian who has reported from the Balkans, Afghanistan, Iraq, Latin America and Los Angeles. He is the Ireland correspondent for The Guardian. His book on Hugo Chávez, Comandante, was published in March 2013.

Early life and career
Born in Dublin, Carroll is a graduate of Blackrock College, Trinity College and Dublin City University. He began his career at The Irish News in Belfast, working as a reporter and diarist from 1995 to 1997, when he was named young journalist of the year in Northern Ireland's media awards.

From 1999, he was deployed by The Guardian as a foreign correspondent in Yemen. and Serbia for the aftermath of the Kosovo war.

His report from Qalaye Niazi, where a wedding party was bombed by US planes, fuelled criticism of the Pentagon's air campaign. He reported on the UK's first overseas combat deployment since the first Gulf War.

Africa correspondent
He interviewed a Liberian female rebel commander (nicknamed "Black Diamond"). His article about rape in Congo provided the introduction to an essay by Cherie Blair for a Human Rights Watch volume on torture.

Carroll's article about Hamilton Naki that appeared in The Guardian in 2003 was cited by The New York Times as the original source of their erroneous reporting in 2005 about the role Hamilton Naki played when the first heart transplant was performed at Groote Schuur Hospital in Cape Town, South Africa in 1967.

Iraq correspondent
Carroll took over The Guardian'''s Baghdad bureau in January 2005. He covered the US occupation, suicide bombings, the formation of Iraqi military and police units, growing sectarian tension, and the death of several friends, including Marla Ruzicka.

On 19 October 2005 he was abducted in Baghdad after carrying out an interview with a victim of Saddam Hussein's regime in Sadr City. The interview had been arranged with the assistance of the Baghdad office of Moqtada al-Sadr. The kidnapping resulted in the Irish government deploying the Army Ranger Wing special forces unit and Arabic-speaking intelligence officers from G2. Carroll was released unharmed by his captors a day later after the British, Irish and Iranian governments, among others, lobbied for his release. The Guardian published Carroll's account of the kidnapping soon after.

Latin America correspondent
In April 2006 he was appointed The Guardian's Latin America correspondent, based in the newspaper's Caracas bureau. His report about oil exploration in Peru's Amazon was disputed by the oil company Perenco. A series he wrote in 2010 on Mexico's drug war was longlisted for the Orwell prize. He wrote an article about aid tourists in Haiti. Carroll's reporting from Venezuela was criticised by Red Pepper in 2008 for what it considered his pro-US, anti-Chávez bias. Carroll said that he is "not a champion of impartiality".

Carroll said "I see a government that is doing some good things and some bad things". "I try to give a sense of how bizarre and funny some things are,"..."like when Chávez, on his own [weekly] TV show, Aló Presidente, ordered the mobilisation of 9,000 soldiers and tanks to the Colombian border. On the one hand that's a serious story, but there is bombast too ... mobilisation on that scale never happened."

On 3 July 2011, The Observer published an article by Carroll featuring an interview with Noam Chomsky concerning the detention of Maria Lourdes Afiuni, an arrested Venezuelan judge, in which Chomsky criticised the government of Hugo Chávez. Chomsky commented in an email exchange with the Znet blogger Joe Emersberger that the report was "deceptive" because of the omission of his comparison of the case of Chelsea Manning (then known as Bradley Manning) with the arrested Venezuelan judge, among other points, and rejected the assertion that Venezuela was less democratic than before Chávez took office: "I don’t think so, and never suggested it." Carroll's article did mention that Chomsky had criticised the US over the Manning case, without providing a quote. The newspaper reproduced the entire transcript of Carroll's exchange with Chomsky the following day on its website. Chomsky had said "[T]he United States is in no position to complain about this. Bradley Manning has been imprisoned without charge, under torture, which is what solitary confinement is".

In an article published in March 2013, shortly after Chávez died, Carroll said that the former Venezuelan President left an "ambiguous legacy of triumph, ruin and uncertainty". "Whither his '21st-century socialist revolution', a unique experiment in power fuelled by charisma and bountiful oil revenues?"

US West Coast correspondent
Carroll's interview with Rodney King was published at the beginning of May 2012, on the 20th anniversary of the LA riots.

Ireland correspondent
, Carroll is The Guardian's Ireland correspondent.

Book on Hugo ChávezComandante was published on 7 March 2013—two days after the announcement of Chávez's death—by Penguin Press in the US and by Canongate in the UK. Translations are underway for editions in Brazil, China, Mexico, Spain, Italy, Estonia and Poland. It was named by Foreign Policy magazine as one of the 25 books to read in 2013.

John Sweeney in The Literary Review called the book "a well-considered and painfully fair epitaph" but said it was encumbered with respect for chavistas' aspirations.

See also
List of kidnappings

References

External links
Rory Carroll's website.
Articles by Rory Carroll in The Guardian
"Guardian journalist abducted in Baghdad" from The Guardian''.
News of Carroll release from RTÉ.

1972 births
Alumni of Dublin City University
Alumni of Trinity College Dublin
Foreign hostages in Iraq
Irish journalists
Irish people taken hostage
Living people
Mass media people from Dublin (city)
People educated at Blackrock College
The Guardian journalists